Anthony Florian Zaleski (May 29, 1913 – March 20, 1997), known professionally as Tony Zale, was an American boxer. Zale was born and raised in Gary, Indiana, a steel town, which gave him his nickname, "Man of Steel", reinforced by his reputation of being able to take fearsome punishment and still rally to win. Zale, who held the world middleweight title multiple times, was known as a crafty boxer and punishing body puncher who wore his opponents down before knocking them out.  In 1990, Zale was awarded the Presidential Citizens Medal by President George. H. W. Bush.

World middleweight title

Zale met Georgie Abrams in Madison Square Garden in a world middleweight championship match on November 28, 1941, before a crowd of nearly 10,000.  Despite knocking Zale down in the first round, a poke in the eye from Zale's glove left him with pain and blurred vision. From the fourth round on, Abrams fought with his left eye nearly closed.  Blood from a cut opened above his right eye in the third from an accidental head butt from Zale caused additional vision problems from blood that dripped from the wound. Despite fighting half blind, Abrams fought courageously for fifteen rounds. Abrams lost in a close match, due to the incessant body attacks of Zale in the late rounds, particularly the ninth where he received a severe two handed attack to the midsection.  The Associated Press judged Abrams the winner with eight rounds to Zale's seven.

Bouts against Rocky Graziano, 1946–48
Zale was a two-time world middleweight champion and made The Rings list of 100 greatest punchers of all time.  Zale is best remembered for his three bouts over a 21-month period with Rocky Graziano for the middleweight crown. These three bouts were among the most brutal and exciting middleweight championship matches of all time. The first match took place in Yankee Stadium, New York City.  Zale had served in World War II, was thirty-three years old, and had been inactive for about four years. Graziano was on a winning knockout streak and seemed to be in his prime. In their first match (September 27, 1946), after flooring Graziano in the first round, Zale took a savage beating from Graziano, and was on the verge of losing the fight by TKO. However, he rallied and knocked out Graziano in the sixth round to retain his title.  The rematch, a year later in Chicago (July 16, 1947), was a mirror image of their first fight.  Graziano was battered around the ring, suffered a closed eye and appeared ready to lose by a knockout, then rallied and knocked Zale out in the sixth round, becoming middleweight champion of the world.

Their last fight was held in New Jersey the following year (June 10, 1948).  Zale regained his crown, winning the match by a knockout in the third round. The knockout blows consisted of a perfect combination of a right to Graziano's body, then a left hook to Graziano's jaw. Graziano was knocked unconscious. This fight was Zale's last hurrah. His age and the many ring wars he fought seemed to catch up with him in his next fight against European Champion Marcel Cerdan later that year, who stopped him in the eleventh round to win the middleweight championship of the world (September 21, 1948).  Graziano commented that years later he would wake up in a cold sweat having had the recurring nightmare of being back in the ring with Zale, who he said really was a man of steel.

Edith Piaf, who at the time was having an affair with Cerdan, was in the audience, praying to Saint Therese for his victory. Two of the three Graziano fights and the Cerdan fight were named The Ring magazine Fight of the Year.

Zale was a 1991 inductee to the International Boxing Hall of Fame (IBHOF). In November 2015, his championship belts were stolen from the IBHOF. The belts were on loan from Zale's family, and have yet to be returned.

Zale was originally cast to play himself in the movie Somebody Up There Likes Me.  According to director Robert Wise, Paul Newman (playing Graziano) was hesitant to fully engage Zale during rehearsal, fearing that Zale might reflexively knock him out if Newman inadvertently hit him too hard. As Newman had to appear aggressive against Zale in the film, Wise felt it was necessary to replace Zale with actor Courtland Shepard for the final fight scene.

Professional boxing record

See also
List of middleweight boxing champions

References

External links

 
 World Boxing Hall of Fame Inductees

|-

|-

|-

|-

|-

1913 births
1997 deaths
Middleweight boxers
Boxers from Indiana
Sportspeople from Gary, Indiana
American people of Polish descent
American male boxers
American military personnel of World War II
International Boxing Hall of Fame inductees